Dzhankoi is a military air base (ICAO: UKFY) near Dzhankoi, Crimea. It is currently operated by the Russian Air Force. Prior to the Russian occupation of Crimea in 2014, Dzhankoi was a Ukrainian military airfield, and then a civilian airport. In 1995, Dhankoi was entered in the State Register of Civil Aerodromes of Ukraine, and in 1999 it was certified as an international airport, with the ability to accept and release aircraft of all classes day and night in complex meteorological conditions.

 the Russian 39th Helicopter Regiment which flies the Kamov Ka-52 "Alligator" (NATO: Hokum B), Mil Mi-8AMTSh (NATO: Hip), Mil Mi-28N (NATO: Havoc) and Mil Mi-35M (NATO: Hind) uses the base under the 27th Composite Aviation Division.

References

Russian Air Force bases
Buildings and structures in Crimea
Ukrainian airbases
Airports in Crimea
Airports in Ukraine